Zhan Jian (born 30 January 1982 in Huangshi, Hubei) is a Chinese-born Singaporean table tennis player. He competed for Singapore in the men's team event at the 2012 Summer Olympics. At the 2014 Commonwealth Games, he won the men's individual table tennis, beating teammate Gao Ning 4 - 0 in the final. He was also part of the Singaporean men's team that won gold. In the men's doubles, he and teammate Yang Zi missed out on the final and could only win bronze.

In 2015, Zhang retired from table tennis after a recurring elbow injury.

References

External links
 

1982 births
Living people
Table tennis players from Hubei
People from Huangshi
Chinese emigrants to Singapore
Singaporean sportspeople of Chinese descent
Naturalised citizens of Singapore
Naturalised table tennis players
Chinese male table tennis players
Singaporean male table tennis players
Table tennis players at the 2012 Summer Olympics
Olympic table tennis players of Singapore
Table tennis players at the 2014 Commonwealth Games
Commonwealth Games medallists in table tennis
Commonwealth Games gold medallists for Singapore
Commonwealth Games bronze medallists for Singapore
Universiade medalists in table tennis
Southeast Asian Games medalists in table tennis
Southeast Asian Games gold medalists for Singapore
Competitors at the 2013 Southeast Asian Games
Universiade silver medalists for China
Medalists at the 2007 Summer Universiade
Medallists at the 2014 Commonwealth Games